Dan Chiasson (born May 9, 1971 in Burlington, Vermont) is an American poet, critic, and journalist. The Sewanee Review called Chiasson "the country’s most visible poet-critic." He is the Lorraine C. Wang Professor of English Literature at Wellesley College.

Chiasson is the author of six books: The Afterlife of Objects (University of Chicago Press, 2002), Natural History (Alfred A. Knopf, 2005), One Kind of Everything: Poem and Person in Contemporary America (University of Chicago Press, 2007), Where's the Moon, There's the Moon (Alfred A. Knopf, 2010), Bicentennial (Alfred A. Knopf, 2014) and The Math Campers (Alfred A. Knopf, 2020).

Chiasson is currently working on "Bernie for Burlington: Sanders in a Changing Vermont, 1968-1991," to be published by Pantheon in 2025.

Life
Chiasson grew up in Burlington, Vermont as the only child of his single mother. He attended Catholic schools, Mater Christi School and Rice Memorial High School, from which he graduated in 1989. He graduated summa cum laude in Classics and English from Amherst College (1993), and from Harvard University, where he received a Ph.D. in English and was awarded the Whiting Foundation Award in the Humanities.

In addition to teaching at Wellesley, Chiasson has been affiliated with Boston University's Master of Fine Arts program, with NYU's program in Paris, France, and with the Middlebury College Bread Loaf Environmental Conference in Ripton, Vermont. He lives in Wellesley, Massachusetts, with his wife and two sons.

Chiasson is a longtime contributor to The New Yorker and The New York Review of Books. He was the poetry editor (with Meghan O'Rourke), and later advisory editor, of the Paris Review. His poems have been translated into many languages, including German by Jan Wagner. His Natural History was published as Naturgeschichte at Luxbooks, a publishing house focused on American poetry in bilingual editions. In the UK, he is published by Bloodaxe Books.

He is on the editorial board of the literary magazine The Common, based at Amherst College.

Honors and awards
 2008 Award in Literature, American Academy of Arts and Letters 
 2008 Guggenheim Fellowship for poetry 
 2004 Whiting Award

Bibliography
See also links in the External links section below.

Poetry
Collections
 
 
 
 
 
Anthologies
 
List of poems

Criticism
 
 
 
 
 
 
 
 
 
 
 
 
 
 
 
 
 
 
 
———————
Notes

References

External links
Search for Chiasson's work in The New Yorker
Search for Chiasson's work in The New York Review of Books
Search for Chiasson's work in The Paris Review
Profile at The Whiting Foundation
Dan Chiasson interviewed by Christopher Lydon, "Whose Words These Are," Radio Open Source, May 27, 2010
"Amherst Poets Dream Date: Interview with Dan Chiasson" by Josh Jacobs, September 2011

Living people
American male poets
Poets from Vermont
Poets from Massachusetts
Amherst College alumni
Harvard Graduate School of Arts and Sciences alumni
Amherst College faculty
Wellesley College faculty
The New Yorker people
Writers from Burlington, Vermont
People from Sudbury, Massachusetts
1971 births
American male essayists
21st-century American male writers
21st-century American essayists
21st-century American poets